Octar or Ouptaros was a Hunnic ruler. He ruled in dual kingship with his brother Rugila, possibly with a geographical division, ruling the Western Huns while his brother ruled the Eastern Huns.

History
Octar ruled along with his brother Rugila as reported by Jordanes in his Getica: "...Mundzucus, whose brothers were Octar and Ruas, who were supposed to have been kings before Attila, although not altogether of the same [territories] as he". Their brother Mundzuk was the father of Attila, but he was not a supreme ruler of the Huns. According to Priscus their fourth brother Oebarsius was still alive in 448 AD. Their ancestors and relation with previous rulers Uldin and Charaton are unknown.

He ruled with his brother in dual kingship, possibly a geographical division where Rugila ruled over Eastern Huns while Octar over Western Huns, possibly like Attila and Bleda.

According to Socrates of Constantinople, Octar, identified with Ouptaros, died in 430 near the Rhine, "[f]or the king of the Huns, Uptaros by name, having burst asunder in the night from surfeit, the Burgundians attacked that [the Huns of Uptaros] people then without a leader; and although few in numbers and their opponents many, they obtained victory".

Etymology
The name is recorded in two variants, Greek Ούπταρος (Ouptaros), and Latin Octar. The change from -ct- to -pt- is characteristic of Balkan Latin. Otto J. Maenchen-Helfen considered the name to be of unknown origin. Omeljan Pritsak derived the name from Turkic-Mongolian word *öktem (strong, brave, imperious; proud, boastful; pride) and verb ökte- / oktä- (to encourage). He argued that the deverbal Turkic-Mongolian suffix m was replaced in Turkic by z while in Mongolian by ri. The reconstructed form is appellative *öktä-r.

References

Sources
 
 
 

Hunnic rulers
5th-century monarchs in Europe
5th-century Hunnic rulers
430 deaths